General Dyer may refer to:

Alexander Brydie Dyer (1815–1874), Union Army brigadier general and brevet major general
Edward C. Dyer (1907–1975), U.S. Marine Corps brigadier general
Reginald Dyer (1864–1927), British Indian Army brigadier general (temporary rank)